Du'Vonta Lampkin (January 7, 1997 – May 5, 2022) was an American professional football player who was a defensive tackle. He played college football for the Oklahoma Sooners.

Early years
Lampkin attended Cypress Falls High School in Houston, Texas. As a senior, he tallied 81 tackles (38 for loss), 16 sacks, and eight forced fumbles. He committed to play football for the Oklahoma Sooners in November 2013, but decommitted in April 2014. He then committed and signed to play for the Texas Longhorns, but due to academic issues, was unable to attend Texas. He then enrolled at Oklahoma and joined the football team on scholarship.

College career
Lampkin did not play as a true freshman in 2015 and redshirted. 

As a redshirt freshman in 2016, Lampkin played in five games, missing six due to suspension. He tallied five tackles (two for loss) and two quarterback hurries.

In 2017, as a redshirt sophomore, Lampkin played in 12 of Oklahoma's 14 games, missing two games due to academic issues. In 12 games, he recorded 23 tackles (five for loss) and one sack. After the season, he decided to forgo the remaining two years of eligibility, but ended up undrafted.

Professional career
After going undrafted in the 2018 NFL Draft, Lampkin participated in the Baltimore Ravens rookie mini-camp, but was not signed. On July 31, 2018, Lampkin signed with the Tennessee Titans. He was waived on September 1, 2018.

Massachusetts Pirates
Lampkin signed with the Massachusetts Pirates of the National Arena League for the 2019 season. Lampkin appeared in three games and recorded one tackle.

Death
On May 5, 2022, Lampkin died after being shot in a Dallas apartment. On July 8, 2022, Dallas police officers arrested two people Antwan Franklin and Erick Garcia for the murder of Lampkin. Franklin reportedly set up the fatal robbery of his friend Lampkin.

References

External links
Oklahoma Sooners bio

1997 births
2022 deaths
Players of American football from Houston
American football defensive tackles
Oklahoma Sooners football players
Tennessee Titans players
Massachusetts Pirates players
Deaths by firearm in Texas